Manchester Storm may refer to:

Manchester Storm (1995–2002), an ice hockey team from Manchester, England
Manchester Storm (2015–), a British professional ice hockey team founded in 2015